Bayne was a small settlement in Russell County, Kansas, United States.

History
Bayne, Russell County, Kansas was issued a post office in 1883. The post office was discontinued in 1888. Ingalls, Kansas across the Lincoln County line was then renamed Bayne.

References

Former populated places in Russell County, Kansas
Former populated places in Kansas